Serge Demierre (born 16 January 1956) was a Swiss professional road bicycle racer. He competed in the individual road race event at the 1976 Summer Olympics. In 1983, Demierre won the Combativity award and the 4th stage of the 1983 Tour de France. He was the Swiss National Road Race champion in 1983.

Major results

1976
 National Amateur Road Race Championship
1981
Trofeo Baracchi (with Daniel Gisiger)
1982
Buch am Irchel
1983
 National Road Race Championship
Tour de France
Winner stage 4
Winner Combativity award
1987
Lausanne
Sion

References

External links 

Official Tour de France results for Serge Demierre

1956 births
Living people
Swiss male cyclists
Swiss Tour de France stage winners
Cyclists at the 1976 Summer Olympics
Olympic cyclists of Switzerland
Cyclists from Geneva
Tour de Suisse stage winners
20th-century Swiss people
21st-century Swiss people